The 2009 Bulldogs RLFC season  was the 75th in the club's history. They competed in the NRL's 2009 Telstra Premiership, finishing the regular season 2nd (out of 16), a vast improvement on the previous season, when they came last. The Bulldogs came within one match of the grand final but were knocked out by the Parramatta Eels.

Season summary 
After an extremely disappointing 2008 season, in which the club finished with the wooden spoon, 2009 will be a season of rebuilding for the Bulldogs. A number of high-profile new recruits, including Brett Kimmorley, Josh Morris, Michael Ennis, David Stagg and Ben Hannant along with mid-season signing of Greg Eastwood will join the club.

Fixtures 
During the regular season, the Bulldogs will play most home games at ANZ Stadium in Homebush Bay. ANZ Stadium is also the home ground of the South Sydney Rabbitohs, and one of the home grounds of the Parramatta Eels, so Bulldogs away matches against these two teams will also be played at this venue. Two Bulldogs home games will be played away from Homebush Bay: the Round 11 match against Melbourne will be played at Bluetongue Stadium in Gosford, and the Round 19 match against the Gold Coast will be played at Suncorp Stadium in Brisbane.

Trial Matches

Regular season

Finals Series

Ladder

2009 squad

See also
 List of Canterbury-Bankstown Bulldogs seasons

References

External links
Bulldogs: Season Review - NRL.com

Canterbury-Bankstown Bulldogs seasons
Bulldogs RLFC season